Rhona McLeod is a Scottish broadcaster.

McLeod is a former international athlete and was a member of the Scottish Athletics team for seven years

Athletics career
As an athlete, her preferred events included sprint hurdles and long jump and she enjoyed a wealth of travel experiences around the world competing for her country. It was always her aim to combine her interest in sport with a future career in journalism.

Media career
After a freshman year studying Broadcasting at the University of Wyoming, she completed a BA degree in Media Studies at the University of Stirling.

In her working career McLeod started out by writing for the specialist sports magazines Scotland's Runner, Scottish, The Punter football magazine and Today's Runner. 

In 1995, she joined BBC Scotland. For 20 years she Presented the sport segment on Reporting Scotland. She also presented Sport Nation on television and Sport Weekly on BBC Radio Scotland.

In her time with BBC Scotland McLeod reported and presented from the France 98 World Cup, and Commonwealth Games in Kuala Lumpur, Manchester Melbourne Commonwealth Games, Glasgow 2014 and Gold Coast Commonwealth Games. She also presented sport from London 2012 Olympic Games.

For BBC One Scotland, McLeod wrote, presented and produced the documentary Gambian Goals - A Donkeymentary for a series of Make Poverty History programmes. She also produced and presented the first television interview with Philippa York for BBC Sport. She is the recipient of a Royal Television Society Award for Sports News journalism.

In May 2019 McLeod left BBC Scotland to form her own media company McLeod Media. Notable clients include World Athletics, Olympic Broadcasting Services, UK Athletics, Sportscotland, Scottish Rugby Union and Athletics Weekly amongst others. In this time she has reported and presented from 2020 Winter Youth Olympics in Lausanne, World Athletics Relays in Poland, Tokyo Olympics 2020 and the World Athletics Indoor Championships 2022 in Belgrade.

Her hobbies include walking her dog Archie, painting, watching and playing sport. She is married with two daughters.

References
Interview: Rhona McLeod Tokyo Olympic Games

External links
https://mcleod-media.co.uk
https://athleticsweekly.com/author/rhona-mcleod

Alumni of the University of Stirling
BBC Scotland newsreaders and journalists
Living people
Scottish sports broadcasters
Scottish television presenters
Scottish women television presenters
People educated at Lenzie Academy
1966 births
British women television journalists
Scottish women radio presenters
Scottish radio presenters
Scottish women journalists